is a Japanese video game producer and businessman. He was the former CEO and producer of the Capcom subsidiary Clover Studio, who developed the games Viewtiful Joe, Ōkami, and God Hand. He is currently the head producer at the development division at PlatinumGames and the CEO since 2021, after years being vice-president in the company.

Career
Inaba was born in Kanazawa, Ishikawa, in 1971.

Inaba first worked for Irem, specifically working on R-Type Leo.  From there he joined Nazca Corporation and then SNK, where he did programming work on Samurai Shodown. After reading a want ad for Capcom in Famitsu magazine, Inaba joined the company in 1998 with hopes of working on the next Resident Evil game. He ended up working on Hideki Kamiya's Devil May Cry, and later produced games in the Ace Attorney and Steel Battalion series. Inaba, Kamiya, and Shinji Mikami, as well as other Capcom employees, began working at the company's new second-party developer Clover Studio in April 2004. Inaba acted as the team's producer and CEO, which managed to produce a few titles, including the critically acclaimed Ōkami. Inaba left Capcom in 2006 to form his own company, named SEEDS.  Clover was being officially closed by Capcom in early 2007.

In October 2007, SEEDS merged with the company ODD. This new company was rebranded as PlatinumGames. He holds the position of head producer of the development division.

The company employs many former key members of Clover. In May 2008, PlatinumGames announced a four-game deal with Sega. The games involved in the development and publishing deal include Bayonetta, a "stylish action game" for the PlayStation 3 and Xbox 360 directed by Hideki Kamiya and featuring "a witch battling angels", a science-fiction RPG for the Nintendo DS called Infinite Space, MadWorld, an "ultra ultra violent" action game for the Wii with black and white Sin City-inspired graphics., and Vanquish, an action heavy  third-person shooter directed by Shinji Mikami. A fifth game, Anarchy Reigns, was later added to this deal and was released in 2012 for PS3 and Xbox 360.

Inaba was also the producer for Metal Gear Rising: Revengeance after PlatinumGames picked up development from Kojima Productions.

In January 2021, it was announced that he would be the new CEO of PlatinumGames. Previously, Inaba was vice-president for years.

Recognition
Inaba was ranked number 49 on IGN's Top 100 Game Creators of All Time list in 2009.

Works

References

External links

 PlatinumGames website
 

1971 births
Capcom people
Nintendo people
Japanese chief executives
Japanese video game designers
Living people
People from Kanazawa, Ishikawa